Hammond is a South Shore Line station in Hammond, Indiana that serves trains west and north to Millennium Station and east to East Chicago, Gary, Michigan City, and South Bend, Indiana. Westbound, this is the last stop before trains cross into Illinois, and the first stop in Indiana for outbound trains.

Facilities
Hammond consists of a pair of high-level platforms located between the crossings of Hohman and Johnson Avenues. The southern platform is a side platform serving eastbound trains to Michigan City and South Bend while the northern platform, situated between the two tracks, is of the island type but only serves westbound trains to Chicago. The tracks through the station are gauntlet tracks which permit the passage of freight trains. The station building is located east of Hohman Avenue south of the tracks. The station is not staffed, instead only being equipped with a ticket vending machine. To the east of the station is a parking lot with capacity for 718 cars.

History

The station originally had ground-level platforms, but in 1998, those were replaced with high-level platforms to allow for level boarding and increased accessibility. A new station building was constructed that year.

Future
The existing station is planned to be replaced by the Hammond Gateway Station as part of the West Lake Corridor project, estimated to be completed in 2025. Hammond Gateway would act as an interchange for West Lake Corridor passengers to points east and west on the South Shore Line.

See also
Hammond–Whiting station (Amtrak)

References

External links
 
 South Shore Line - Stations
 Hammond Station since 1998 (South Shore Railfan.net)

South Shore Line stations in Indiana
Hammond, Indiana
Railway stations in Lake County, Indiana